The Liechtenstein Football Association (LFV) is the governing body of football in Liechtenstein. It was established on 28 April 1934, and became affiliated to UEFA on 22 May 1974. The association organizes the Liechtenstein national football team and the Liechtenstein Football Cup. Because Liechtenstein has fewer than 8 (only 7 not counting reserves) active teams, it is the only UEFA member without its own national league. This means the Liechtensteiner teams play in the Swiss Football League system. The LFV is based in Schaan.

See also
Liechtenstein national football team
Liechtenstein Football Cup
Liechtenstein football clubs in European competitions
Football in Liechtenstein

References

External links
Official website
Liechtenstein at FIFA site
Liechtenstein at UEFA site

Liechtenstein
Football in Liechtenstein
Football
Sports organizations established in 1934
1934 establishments in Liechtenstein